Events from the year 1562 in Sweden

Incumbents
 Monarch – Eric XIV

Events

 2 June - Swedish troops conquer Pärnu.
 4 October - The wedding between Prince John and Catherine Jagiellon causes a conflict between the king and his brother. 
 Summer - Swedish troops conquer Paide.
 Swedish troops conquer Karkus, Estonia.
 On the request of the citizens of Reval, Eric XIV bans all trade with Narva.

Births

 Lucretia Magnusdotter (Gyllenhielm), illegitimate royal daughter (died 1624)

Deaths

References

 
Years of the 16th century in Sweden
Sweden